Alfred Sosgórnik (16 August 1933 – 8 February 2013) was a Polish athlete. He competed in the men's shot put at the 1960 Summer Olympics and the 1964 Summer Olympics.

References

1933 births
2013 deaths
Athletes (track and field) at the 1960 Summer Olympics
Athletes (track and field) at the 1964 Summer Olympics
Polish male shot putters
Olympic athletes of Poland
People from Strzelce County
Sportspeople from Opole Voivodeship
20th-century Polish people